Lysogorsky District is an administrative and municipal district (raion), one of the thirty-eight in Saratov Oblast, Russia. It is located in the southwest of the oblast. Its administrative center is the urban locality (a work settlement) of Lysye Gory. Population: 19,948 (2010 Census);  The population of Lysye Gory accounts for 36.0% of the district's total population.

References

Notes

Sources

Districts of Saratov Oblast